The Battle of Ypres was a series of engagements during the First World War, near the Belgian city of Ypres, between the German and the Allied armies (Belgian, French, British Expeditionary Force and Canadian Expeditionary Force). During the five engagements, casualties may have surpassed one million.

First Battle of Ypres (19 October – 22 November 1914). During the Race to the Sea. More than 250,000 casualties.
Second Battle of Ypres (22 April – 15 May 1915). First mass use of poison gas by the German army. Around 100,000 casualties.
Battle of Passchendaele (31 July – 10 November 1917) also known as the Third Battle of Ypres. Between 400,000 and 800,000 casualties.
Battle of the Lys (9–29 April 1918) also known as the Battle of Estaires or the Fourth Battle of Ypres. Around 200,000 casualties.
Fifth Battle of Ypres (28 September–2 October 1918) an informal name given to a series of battles in northern France and southern Belgium, also known as Advance of Flanders and Battle of the Peaks of Flanders. Around 10,000 Allied casualties; German casualties unknown.

References

Dancocks, Daniel G. Welcome to Flanders Fields: the First Canadian Battle of the Great War : Ypres, 1915. Toronto: McClelland & Stewart, 1988.

Former disambiguation pages converted to set index articles